Benjamin Daimio is a fictional comic book character who appears in Dark Horse Comics books featuring Hellboy and the Bureau for Paranormal Research and Defense, of which Daimio is an employee. Created by Mike Mignola, John Arcudi and Guy Davis, Daimio first appeared in B.P.R.D.: The Dead #1 (December 2004). A formerly dead United States Marine, Daimio suffers from a curse that transforms him into a horrific jaguar-like creature. 

A version of Daimio appeared in the 2019 film reboot of Hellboy played by Daniel Dae Kim.

Fictional character biography
As revealed in the second issue of B.P.R.D.: The Universal Machine, Captain Ben Daimio was a Japanese-American who was the former leader of a squad of 8 U.S. Marines assigned to a rescue mission in the Bolivian jungle (numbered D16F8-4188) on June 10, 2001, to save the nuns apparently captured by a fundamentalist group called the True Path, though the True Path was a peaceful political group that never engaged in violent activities beforehand. The mission went awry when the true culprits, a native jaguar cult who murdered the nuns, attacked the group. Shortly thereafter, a shapeless entity made itself known and slaughtered them until only Daimio remained, the incident leading him to be severely scarred on the left side of his face. He then collapsed and died from his injuries, while he received horrific visions of a giant jaguar-like spirit who told Daimio that his new life was to begin. Three days later, Daimio's corpse was recovered and scheduled for autopsy. However, he returned to life just prior to the procedure, cutting his way out of his body bag. After a brief period of recovery, Daimio was transferred to The Pentagon's Special Ops and began acting as an informal consultant to the Bureau for Paranormal Research and Defense.

In 2004 after Dr. Kate Corrigan and Abe Sapien requested leave during B.P.R.D.: The Dead Daimio left the Pentagon and joined the B.P.R.D as Field Team Commander. He spearheaded the relocation of the Bureau from Fairfield, Connecticut to the mothballed Center for Defense Research and Development in the Colorado mountains a secret facility he became aware of during his time in the Pentagon. The move was not without difficulties and Daimio's blunt attitude, callousness and preference for force over diplomacy caused friction within the team, particularly with Liz Sherman.

Daimio still displays serious facial trauma from the events that killed him in 2001, including a gaping tear in his left cheek and missing left ear. It is unknown whether he has refused reconstructive surgery, or if such surgery has proved impossible due to his unclear medical status. After the events of The Dead, Daimio has begun undergoing medical treatments with an apparition he calls "Chinaman". These mysterious treatments seem linked to a bizarre, monkey-like specimen in a jar Daimio recovered that had once belonged to his grandmother, an Imperial Japanese agent known as The Crimson Lotus. The embalmed creature appears identical to one Daimio saw in his visions just before his death in the jungle.

In B.P.R.D.: Killing Ground, after years of faithful service to the Bureau, Daimio's loyalty was called into question by Johann Kraus, who uncovered Daimio's relation to the Crimson Lotus and resulted in Daimio beginning to act erratically, which led to his supposed death by a mysterious invader who launched a rocket at his room. However, Daimio emerged from the flames as a monstrous, jaguar-like creature which twice attempted to kill Liz Sherman, but was thwarted first by Abe Sapien and Agent Devon, and then by Johann Kraus, whose ghostly spirit was in possession of a superhuman host at the time. However, before escaping, Daimio tore off the jaw of Kraus' host body, effectively killing it, but leaving Kraus' spirit unharmed.

The final issue reveals that Daimio was changed by the jaguar spirit while he was in Bolivia, causing him to involuntarily transform into a were-jaguar at night. His treatments with the "Chinaman" were supposed to suppress this transformation, but eventually it became too strong and he could no longer contain it. It is also revealed that he caused all of the deaths inside B.P.R.D. headquarters during this mini-series, contrary to the initial belief that it was a rampaging wendigo. Guilt-ridden with his actions, Daimio is last seen in the Colorado wilderness, standing before the now released Wendigo, Daryl, as revealed in B.P.R.D. Hell on Earth: The Long Death, as Johann tracked him down to the Canadian wilderness. After having approached Daryl, Daimio lost control of his transformation and attacked the normally placid Wendigo in his were-jaguar form. This forced Daryl to fight back. After an extended fight, the were-jaguar walked away after having seemingly slain Daryl, only for the Wendigo to recover and launch a surprise attack. Daimio was killed by the Wendigo off-panel, though it is unknown if his spirit inhabits his killer.

In other media
Ben Daimio appeared first time in the Hellboy reboot where he was portrayed by Korean American actor Daniel Dae Kim.

References

External links
 Hellboy Zone. Dark Horse Comics.

Comics characters introduced in 2004
Dark Horse Comics film characters
Fictional Federal Bureau of Investigation personnel
Fictional United States Marine Corps personnel
Fictional military captains
Fictional characters with post-traumatic stress disorder
Hellboy characters
Dark Horse Comics superheroes
Characters created by Mike Mignola
Fictional Japanese American people
Fictional therianthropes